Michael Bishop (born 20 October 1952) is an English cricketer. He played three first-class matches for Cambridge University Cricket Club between 1976 and 1978.

See also
 List of Cambridge University Cricket Club players

References

External links
 

1952 births
Living people
English cricketers
Cambridge University cricketers
People from Marlborough, Wiltshire